Komatosuchus is an extinct genus of temnospondyl within the family Micromelerpetontidae.

See also

 Prehistoric amphibian
 List of prehistoric amphibians

References

Dissorophoids
Triassic temnospondyls of Europe
Fossil taxa described in 1992